The plum-faced lorikeet (Oreopsittacus arfaki), also known as the whiskered lorikeet, is a species of parrot in the family Psittaculidae. It is monotypic within the genus Oreopsittacus.
It is found in the New Guinea Highlands.

Description
It has two white stripes under each eye. It has a narrow pointed black bill and dark-brown irises. The adult male has a red forehead and the adult female has a green forehead.

Taxonomy
The plum-faced lorikeet is the only species of the genus Oreopsittacus and it has three subspecies:

Oreopsittacus Salvadori 1877
Oreopsittacus arfaki (Meyer, AB 1874)
Oreopsittacus arfaki arfaki (Meyer, AB 1874) (red-orange abdomen)
Oreopsittacus arfaki grandis Ogilvie-Grant 1895 (green abdomen)
Oreopsittacus arfaki major Ogilvie-Grant 1914 (red-orange abdomen and larger)

Range
The plum-faced lorikeet's native range is the mountains between about 2000 m to 3750 m of mainland New Guinea across both the Indonesian and Papua New Guinean zones of the island.

References

Cited texts
 

Birds of New Guinea
plum-faced lorikeet
Taxonomy articles created by Polbot